Newton I. Aduaka (born 1966) is an England-based, Nigerian-born filmmaker, winner of Best Director at the Pan African Film Festival.

Filmography

Short films
 Voices Behind the Wall (1990)
 Carnival of Silence (1994)
 On the Edge (1997)
 Funeral (2002)

Feature films
 Rage (1999)
 Ezra (2007)

See also
 List of Nigerian film directors

References

Notes
 
 Indiewire
 Hollywood Reporter
 Variety

External links
 
 
 
 

Nigerian film directors
1966 births
Living people
Nigerian emigrants to the United Kingdom
Alumni of the London Film School
Nigerian entertainment industry businesspeople